Verdammt wir leben noch (Damn we're still alive) is Falco's second posthumously-published album, with Out of the Dark (Into the Light) being the first one, having the European release only three weeks after his passing. The album consists of unreleased Falco tracks, including Krise, which, though it has never been finished, was an experimental song Falco made at the end of 1997, several months before his death.

Track listing
Verdammt Wir Leben Noch  (Falco, Thomas Lang, Thomas Rabitsch) - 5:14
Die Königin Von Eschnapur (Falco, Thomas Lang, Thomas Rabitsch) - 4:29
Qué Pasa Hombre? (Falco, Gunther Mende, Candy DeRouge) - 4:14
Europa (Falco, Thomas Lang, Thomas Rabitsch) - 5:07
Fascinating Man (Falco, Rob Bolland, Ferdi Bolland) - 4:00
Poison (Falco, Gunther Mende, Candy DeRouge) - 4:22
Ecce Machina (Thomas Lang) - 5:31
We Live For The Night (Falco, Rob Bolland, Ferdi Bolland) - 3:52
Krise (Falco, Thomas Lang, Thomas Rabitsch) - 3:54
From The North To The South (Falco, Rob Bolland, Ferdi Bolland) - 3:11
Der Kommissar (Club 69 remix) (Falco, Robert Ponger) - 3:41
Verdammt Wir Leben Noch (remix) - 4:26

References

1999 albums
Falco (musician) albums
Albums published posthumously
A&M Records albums
German-language albums